Frederick Bonham Burr (2 August 1887 – 12 March 1915) was an English cricketer who played a single first-class game for Worcestershire against Oxford University in 1911. He made 39 and 7 not outs and caught Ronald Lagden in the first innings.

Burr was born in Blacklands, Hastings, Sussex. During World War I he joined the Worcestershire Regiment and attained the rank of lieutenant. He died in Kemmel, Belgium, aged 27 (although his gravestone erroneously records 28).

References

External links
 

1887 births
1915 deaths
English cricketers
Worcestershire cricketers
British military personnel killed in World War I
British Army personnel of World War I
Worcestershire Regiment officers
Military personnel from Sussex